Adrian Timothy Mannix also known as "Turkey" (born 1988 in St. Finbarrs Hospital, Cork City, County Cork) is an Irish sportsperson.  He plays hurling with his local club Kilworth and was a member of the Cork senior inter-county team in 2009.

Mannix was a star player for Cork at minor level. He won back-to-back Munster minor titles in 2005 and 2006.  In 2009 he played a prominent role with Cork IT and the team reached the Fitzgibbon Cup semi-finals.

At club level, Mannix was described as Kilworth's star forward. His "outstanding" form in Kilworth's march to the 2006 Munster Junior Club Hurling Championship title earned him a call-up to Cork's provisional 2007 senior county squad.  He also turned in an inspirational performance in Kilworth's All-Ireland Junior Club Hurling Championship quarter-final victory over British junior champions Granuaile.

After the 2008 Cork senior panel's refusal to play under the management of Gerald McCarthy, Mannix was among the players called up in their place by McCarthy.  In Cork's first game of the National Hurling League, he turned in an impressive performance against Dublin, and retained his place on the team to play Tipperary.  Mannix again started and scored in the next match, against Galway.

References

1988 births
Living people
Cork inter-county hurlers
Kilworth hurlers